Kalenić may refer to:

 Kalenić (Belgrade), an urban neighborhood of Belgrade, Serbia
 Kalenić market, one of major open markets in Belgrade, Serbia
 Kalenić (Ub), a village near Ub in Central Serbia
 Kalenićki Prnjavor, a village near Rekovac in Central Serbia
 Kalenić Monastery, a Serbian Orthodox monastery
 Kalenići, village near Požega in Central Serbia